Yevgeniy Okorokov (also: Eugene Okorokov; ; born April 6, 1959 in Tomsk, Russia, died January 4, 2022 in Tomsk, Russia) was a male former long-distance runner from Russian Federation, who represented the Soviet Union during his career. He won the 1991 edition of the Reims Marathon, clocking a total time of 2:13:22 on October 20, 1991.

Achievements

References
 1991 Year Ranking

1959 births
Living people
Soviet male long-distance runners
Russian male long-distance runners
Sportspeople from Tomsk